Trichosanthes baviensis is a climbing plant in the family Cucurbitaceae.  No subspecies are listed in the Catalogue of Life.  It was described from the Ba Vi area in northern Vietnam (where its name is qua lâu Ba Vì) and also occurs in southern China.

References

External links
 
 
 Flora of China: 30. Trichosanthes baviensis Gagnepain.  See Illustration (top)

baviensis
Flora of Vietnam
Flora of China